Pon Pon is the title character of an Italian comic strip created by Luciano Bottaro.

Background 
Pon Pon was created by Bottaro in 1955 as Sor Funghetto and was published until 1970 in the children magazine Lo Scolaro. In 1967 it was renamed "Pon Pon" and in 1969 new stories of Pon Pon were published in Re di Picche. From November 1971 to August 1994 the comic strip was regularly published in the weekly magazine Il Giornalino. In 1999 a whole anthology devoted to the character, Pon Pon Annual, was released. In 2000 it resurfaced in the magazine G Baby. The comics is set in a peaceful and serene country village, populated by anthropomorphic mushrooms, each with a different personality, in which the difficulties and dangers are caused not by enemies easily identifiable but by the same flaws of the characters, which represent those of society.

References 

 
Italian comics
Italian comics titles 
Comics characters introduced in 1955
1955 comics debuts
Italian comics characters
Fictional fungi
Fictional Italian people
Magazine mascots
Male characters in comics
Male characters in advertising
Mascots introduced in 1955